Adam Baldwin (born July 30, 1986) is a Canadian indie rock singer-songwriter based in Dartmouth, Nova Scotia. In addition to his solo work, Baldwin currently performs supporting fellow Dartmouth native Matt Mays.

Early life 
Adam Baldwin was born July 30, 1986 in Halifax, Nova Scotia.
  His early years were spent in Fall River, Nova Scotia.

Career 
Baldwin’s musical career began in 2005 with fellow school-mates, Evan Meisner, David Casey, Shaun Hanlon, and Jeremy MacPherson when they formed the alternative country band Gloryhound and the Skyhawks.  Named after a grade 10 science project,  Gloryhound and the Skyhawks released a debut, self-titled album in 2008 while performing weekly and opening for local bands such as Dutch Mason, Matt Mays and El Torpedo and The Trews. It was at this point that Gloryhound’s sound began to transition from the traditional Maritimes blues/roots sound with an influence of Neil Young, The Band and Tom Petty into a genre of fast paced heavy rock.

In  2008, Baldwin left Gloryhound and the Skyhawks and joined  Matt Mays & El Torpedo  as a keyboardist and vocalist. The album Terminal Romance was released that year, the band toured with Kid Rock and was nominated for 5 East Coast Music Awards including Songwriter of the Year and Group Recording of the Year. In 2009, the band Matt Mays & El Torpedo disbanded.  Mays, Baldwin and Jay Smith were joined by four new members including drummer Damien Moynihan, keyboard player Matt Scott, guitar player Matt Hammond and former The Guthries member Serge Samson on bass. In 2012 this new band named Matt Mays released Coyote and toured across Canada promoting the new album.  Coyote won a Juno Award in 2014 for Rock Album of the Year.

In 2013, Baldwin released an award winning self-titled solo debut EP. His work was recognized by Music Nova Scotia and he was awarded the titles of Male Artist of the Year and Musician of the Year during the Nova Scotia Music Week in 2014. He released his first full length album No Telling When (Precisely Nineteen Eighty-Five) in 2016 and in 2019, he released No Rest for the Wicked. Both of these albums won Rock Recording of the Year at the Nova Scotia Music Awards in 2016 and 2019 respectiviely.

In January 2020, Baldwin was invited to perform for a francophone music variety show, Mix Sonore, hosted by Martha Wainwright.  This meeting between Baldwin and Wainwright turned out to be one that would influence Baldwin to continue to make his music.

In March 2020, Baldwin launched his Cross-Country Chin Up concert series via Youtube. This provided Baldwin with an opportunity to perform to a virtual audience and raise funds for many organizations including the Mental Health Foundation of Nova Scotia, Red Cross Stronger Together Nova Scotia Fund, RCMP Fallen Officer Fund, and the Black Cultural Society for Nova Scotia. Two digital EPs: Chin Up Sessions, featuring his own material and Songs for the Parlour, featuring covers, were produced as a result of these sessions.

September 2022 saw the release of Concertos and Serenades.

Discography

Gloryhound and the Skyhawks
Gloryhound and the Skyhawks (2008)

Matt Mays and El Torpedo
Matt Mays + El Torpedo (2005)
Terminal Romance (2008)

Matt Mays
Coyote (2012)

Solo

Singles 

 "Love You with My Eyes Closed" (2013)
 "Daylight" (2016)
 "Rehtaeh" (2016)
 "Salvation" (2019)

Awards and achievements 

East Coast Music Awards
 2017 – Rock Recording of the Year – No Telling When (Precisely Nineteen Eighty-Five) (nomination)
 2017 – Fan's Choice Entertainer of the Year (nomination)
 2017 – Fan's Choice Video of the Year – Daylight (nomination)
2020 – Rock Recording of the Year – No Rest for the Wicked (nomination)
 2023 Solo Recording of the Year - Concertos & Serenades (nomination)
 2023 Song of the Year - Lighthouse in Little Lorraine (nomination)

Music Nova Scotia Awards 
 2014 – Male Artist Recording of the Year – Adam Baldwin (win)
 2014 – Musician of the Year (win)
 2016 – Rock Recording of the Year – No Telling When (Precisely Nineteen Eighty-Five) (win)
2019 – Rock Recording of the Year – No Rest for the Wicked (win)

References

External links
 Official Website
 Facebook
 Twitter
 YouTube
 Instagram
 Bandcamp

Living people
Canadian rock singers
Canadian rock guitarists
Canadian male guitarists
Canadian singer-songwriters
Musicians from Halifax, Nova Scotia
People from Dartmouth, Nova Scotia
1986 births
21st-century Canadian guitarists
21st-century Canadian male singers
Canadian male singer-songwriters